John Hayes is a retired American soccer forward who played professionally in the Major Indoor Soccer League.

Hayes attended St. Louis University, where he played soccer from 1978 to 1981. He was a 1980 Honorable Mention and 1981 First Team All American. In 2009, he was selected to the St. Louis University Men's Soccer Half-Century Team.

On October 26, 1981, the St. Louis Steamers selected Hayes with the first pick of the Major Indoor Soccer League draft.  He played two seasons in St. Louis before finishing his career with one season with the Kansas City Comets.

References

External links
 MISL stats

1960 births
Living people
Soccer players from St. Louis
All-American men's college soccer players
American soccer players
Denver Avalanche players
Kansas City Comets (original MISL) players
Major Indoor Soccer League (1978–1992) players
St. Louis Steamers (original MISL) players
Saint Louis Billikens men's soccer players
Association football forwards